Silas Alexander "Sonny" Utz, III (May 21, 1942 - December 31, 1991) was an American football fullback in the Canadian Football League for the Winnipeg Blue bombers. He also was a member of the Dallas Cowboys in the National Football League. He played college football at Virginia Tech.

Early years
Utz attended Annandale High School, where he practiced football and baseball. He contributed to the school winning four consecutive county football championships. As a senior, he received All-Met and All Northern Region honors.

College career
Utz accepted a football scholarship from Virginia Tech. He was referred to as "Mr. Inside" as a fullback in the Tech offense that featured star quarterback Bob Schweickert, who was called "Mr. Outside." He also played as a linebacker.

1962 season

Utz was one of four backs who ran for over 250 yards for the Gobblers, racking up 261 yards on 66 carries. He scored one touchdown for the 5-5 Techmen.

1963 season

Utz led the conference in scoring for the only Virginia Tech team to ever win the Southern Conference title. He scored 10 touchdowns in 10 games for the Hokies who finished the year 8-2 and with a perfect 5-0 conference mark. He also was second to Sweickert on the team in rushing with 567 yards. That was good enough for third place in the Southern Conference.

1964 season

In the 1964 season, Utz led the Southern in both rushing and scoring. However, the Hokies lost to West Virginia to spoil their bid for back-to-back Southern Conference championships. Utz scored 10 times on the ground in 10 games for the second straight year, but also caught a pass for a touchdown to tally a total of 66 points.

His accomplishments led to his induction into the Virginia Tech Sports Hall of Fame in 1987.

Professional career

Utz was selected by the Dallas Cowboys in the 6th round (75th overall) of the 1965 NFL Draft. He also was selected by the New York Jets in the 13th round (100th overall) of the 1965 AFL Draft. He opted to sign with the Cowboys, but missed all of training camp due to ankle injury he suffered in a motorcycle accident the previous spring. On August 24, 1966, he was waived to be placed on the injured reserve list.

On April 11, 1967, he signed as a free agents with the Atlanta Falcons. He was released on July 21.

In August 1967, he was signed as a free agent by the Winnipeg Blue Bombers of the Canadian Football League. He registered 12 carries for 16 yards, 15 receptions for 145 yards and 12 kickoff returns for 272 yards. He was released in October.

References

External links

1942 births
1991 deaths
People from Annandale, Virginia
Players of American football from Virginia
Canadian football running backs
American players of Canadian football
Dallas Cowboys players
Winnipeg Blue Bombers players
Annandale High School alumni